Kofeysheh or Kafisheh may refer to:
 Kofeysheh, Khorramshahr
 Kafisheh, Shadegan